Vesicle associated membrane proteins (VAMP) are a family of SNARE proteins with similar structure, and are mostly involved in vesicle fusion.

 VAMP1 and VAMP2 proteins known as synaptobrevins are expressed in brain and are constituents of the synaptic vesicles, where they participate in neurotransmitter release.
 VAMP3 (known as cellubrevin) is ubiquitously expressed and participates in regulated and constitutive exocytosis as a constituent of secretory granules and secretory vesicles.
 VAMP5 and VAMP7 (SYBL1) participate in constitutive exocytosis. 
 VAMP5 is a constituent of secretory vesicles, myotubes and tubulovesicular structures.
 VAMP7 is found both in secretory granules and endosomes.
 VAMP8 (known as endobrevin) participates in endocytosis and is found in early endosomes. VAMP8 also participates the regulated exocytosis in pancreatic acinar cells.
VAMP4 is involved in transport from the Golgi.

References

External links
 

Membrane proteins